Partido Acción Ciudadana  may refer to:

 Citizens' Action Party (Costa Rica)
 Party for Citizen Action